The women's 200 metres event at the 2005 Summer Universiade was held on 17–18 August in Izmir, Turkey.

Medalists

Results

Heats
Wind:Heat 1: -0.5 m/s,  Heat 2: +2.6 m/s,  Heat 3: +0.6 m/s,  Heat 4: -1.7 m/s,  Heat 5: -0.1 m/s,  Heat 6: +0.8 m/s,  Heat 7: +1.7 m/s

Quarterfinals
Wind:Heat 1: -0.2 m/s,  Heat 2: +0.5 m/s,  Heat 3: +0.8 m/s,  Heat 4: -0.1 m/s

Semifinals
Wind:Heat 1: +0.2 m/s,  Heat 2: +0.7 m/s

Final
Wind: -1.0 m/s

References

Finals results
Full results

Athletics at the 2005 Summer Universiade
2005 in women's athletics
2005